Fungurume Airport  is an airport serving the copper and cobalt mining community of Fungurume in Lualaba Province, Democratic Republic of the Congo.

See also

Transport in Democratic Republic of the Congo
List of airports in Democratic Republic of the Congo

References

External links
 FallingRain - Fungurume
 HERE Maps - Fungurume Airport
 OpenStreetMap - Fungurume
 OurAirports - Fungurume Airport
 

Airports in Lualaba Province